Neptis biafra, the Biafran sailer, is a butterfly in the family Nymphalidae. It is found in Nigeria (south and the Cross River loop) and western Cameroon.

References

Butterflies described in 1871
biafra
Butterflies of Africa
Taxa named by Christopher Ward (entomologist)